This is a partial listing of prominent political families of Chhattisgarh.

Jogi family
Ajit Jogi, first Chief Minister of Chhattisgarh
Amit Jogi, son of  former Chief Minister Ajit Jogi

Shukla family
 Ravi Shankar Shukla,  Chief Minister of Madhya Pradesh
 Shyama Charan Shukla,  Chief Minister of Madhya Pradesh
Amitesh Shukla, son of Shyama Charan Rural Development Minister in the Chhattisgarh 2002/03
 Vidya Charan Shukla, Minister of External Affairs

Kashyap family
 Baliram Kashyap, member of Lok Sabha from Bastar
 Dinesh Kashyap, Member of Lok Sabha from Bastar

Singh family
 Raman Singh, Ex Chief Minister of Chhattisgarh
 Abhishek Singh, Member of Lok Sabha from Rajnandgaon

See also 

 Political families of India
 List of people from Chhattisgarh

References 

 
Chhattisgarh
Chhattisgarh-related lists